The 1984 Labatt Canada Cup was a professional international ice hockey tournament played during the first three weeks of September 1984. The best-of-three final took place between Canada and Sweden, with Canada winning a two game sweep.  Canadian forward John Tonelli was named the tournament's most valuable player.

This was the only Canada Cup to feature a team from West Germany, who managed a single point in five games based on a 4–4 tie with Czechoslovakia.  This was also the only point for the Czechoslovaks, whose lineup had been weakened by defections, one of whom, Czechoslovak star Peter Šťastný, played for Team Canada in this event. The Canadian team was a disappointing 2–2–1 in the round-robin.  There was inner turmoil on the roster, which was dominated by players of two NHL powerhouses, the Edmonton Oilers and the New York Islanders—these two teams had faced off in the past two Stanley Cup Finals, and there were bitter feuds between players that had to be overcome.  In one semifinal, fourth place Canada faced first-place USSR, who were a perfect 5–0 in the round-robin.  Canada dominated the first two periods, but managed only a 1–0 lead due to spectacular goaltending from Vladimir Myshkin.  The Soviets scored twice in the third to take the lead, but defenceman Doug Wilson tied the game late in regulation.  In overtime, Myshkin continued his brilliant play.  The Soviets got a two-on one against the flow of the play, but were thwarted by a brilliant poke-check by Paul Coffey, who was normally an offensive defenceman.  Later on that play, Coffey's point shot was deflected in front of the net by Mike Bossy for the winning goal.  In the other semi-final, Sweden scored on its first four shots on goal and cruised to a stunning 9–2 victory over the United States.  The Americans had beaten Sweden 7–1 in the round robin and had looked very impressive prior to collapsing in this game.

Canada won Game 1 of the final 5–2.  In Game 2, they built up a commanding 5–0 lead in the first period before Sweden mounted a comeback that fell just short.  The final score was 6–5.

Teams

As in 1981 and 1976 there were six competing teams. The West German national ice hockey team replaced Finland thanks to its fifth-place finish at the 1983 Ice Hockey World Championships.

Round-robin standings

Game scores

Round-robin

Semi-finals

Final

Statistical leaders

Scoring

Goaltending

Minimum 120 minutes played

Awards

See also
List of international ice hockey competitions featuring NHL players

References
Notes

General

Game statistics: Pelletier, 2003, pp. 104–137
Scoring statistics and awards:

External links
Hockey Hall of Fame Tournament Summary

1984
1984–85 in Canadian ice hockey
1984–85 in American ice hockey
1984–85 in Soviet ice hockey
1984–85 in Czechoslovak ice hockey
1984–85 in German ice hockey
1984–85 in Swedish ice hockey
September 1984 sports events in Canada